is a professional Japanese baseball player, who is currently a free agent. He previously played catcher for the Yokohama DeNA BayStars.

References 

1997 births
Living people
People from Ichihara, Chiba
Japanese baseball players
Nippon Professional Baseball pitchers
Yokohama DeNA BayStars players
Baseball people from Chiba Prefecture